Niels Petersen (born 8 September 1932) is a Danish former sport shooter who competed in the 1960 Summer Olympics and in the 1964 Summer Olympics.

References

1932 births
Living people
Danish male sport shooters
ISSF rifle shooters
Olympic shooters of Denmark
Shooters at the 1960 Summer Olympics
Shooters at the 1964 Summer Olympics
Sportspeople from Aarhus